Zott is a German European dairy company founded in Mertingen, Germany in 1926. Zott produces dairy products including milk and cheese products, desserts, cream, and yogurts. The company's main plant is in Mertingen (Bavaria). Other production plants are in Günzburg, Germany, and in Poland: Opole, Głogowo near Toruń, and Racibórz. 

In 2017 Zott reached sales of EUR 865 million (2016), manufactured 951 million kg of milk and employed 3,000 people. Zott is one of the larger dairy companies in Europe and is one of the leading dairy producers in Poland.

Zott international
Zott is represented in more than 75 countries around the world and also has sales offices in the Czech Republic, Slovakia, Hungary and Vietnam.

Zott in Germany 
The main plant of the Zott Group is located in Mertingen (Bavaria), where yogurt, desserts, and mozzarella are produced. Another German production facility is in Günzburg (Bavaria), which focuses on hard and semi-hard cheese, processed cheese and various powder products.

Zott in Poland
In Poland there are three production sites in Opole, Glogowo, and Raciborz. Zott Poland is producing fruit yoghurts, natural products, desserts, drinks, and Twarog.

Sustainability and Charity

Wood-chip heat power station 

A wood-chip heat power station supplies the plant in Mertingen (Germany) with energy.

Plant-for-the-Planet 

Since October 2012, Zott has teamed up with the student initiative "Plant-for-the-Planet" (founded in 2007) to host regular "Zott Plant-for-the-Planet Academies" where kids are introduced in a playful way to the issues of climate justice and environmental protection.

Kids run for Kids 

Since the 2009-2010 school year, Zott has been a sponsor of the "Kids run for Kids" (Motto: On the move to make a difference) initiative, which benefits the SOS Children's Villages Germany and worldwide. With much sympathy and sustained commitment the initiative brings the aspects of nutrition education, physical activity and social engagement closer to the public.

GM-free 

"Knowing where it comes from and what's in it" are two main points of interest to the German consumers. A survey carried out on behalf of Zott on the Forsa Institute, also showed that for 85% of German consumers it is important that food is produced GM-free. This is also important to Zott from Mertingen. Therefore "Zottarella" and "Bayerntaler" were changed to "guaranteed GM-free and import-feed-free".

Zott quality milk with passion 

The program "Zott quality milk with passion" addresses in the first step all German milk producers of Zott. With this program Zott developed an concept which is international adaptable to Poland, Czech Republic and Bosnia-Herzegovina the next years. Together with its milk producers Zott is realising many large and small measures for a liveable and sustainable agriculture of the future, which are reflected by the various components of this program.

Johanniter Christmas Trucker 

Since 2010 the employees of Zott participate at the "Johanniter Christmas Trucker" initiative to bring the mood of Christmas (packages with surprises like toys etc.) to needy families in Eastern Europe. Since 2012 the children of the kindergarten, daycare and school in Mertingen are using the opportunity to join the event organized by Zott. Every year Zott is supporting this initiative with a separate truck and a driver.

Brands

Monte 
Monte is one of the most well-known brands of Zott. Monte is delivered in over 40 countries. Monte is a dessert with the combination of milk cream, hazelnuts and chocolate.

Monte range of products:

Sahne Joghurt
Zott Sahne Joghurt is a cream yoghurt which is well known in Germany and Austria. Sahne Joghurt is available in a lot of variations and flavours.

Zottarella 
Zottarella is a branded Mozzarella of Zott. It is produced from milk which is guaranteed GM-free and import-feed-free. Zottarella is available in numerous different grammages and flavours.

Jogobella 
Jogobella is a famous and market leading Polish Jogurt Brand of Zott.

Milk Tiger 
Milk Tiger was introduced in 2017 as a new brand of Zott.

Advertising 
In Zott TV advertising Maxl Graf and Roberto Blanco were seen as celebrities. In 2010 the company recruited the German goalkeeper René Adler and his brother Rico for several commercials of the brand "Monte". In 2013 Zott changed the brand ambassadors for "Monte". Since then windsurf world champion Philip Köster and his sister Kyra advertise for "Monte". In 2013 Monte Cherry and Monte Crunchy were introduced in Poland by the Polish Volleyball Star Bartosz Kurek. That was the second time Bartosz advertised for Zott Monte.
Csaba Vastag is a Hungarian musician and since 2013 the brand ambassador for Zott Monte in Hungary.

Awards 
Zott regularly receives awards from independent institutions for the high product quality, such as the Bundesehrenpreis, the PriMax as well as gold, silver and bronze medals of the German Agricultural Society (DLG).

 1986: Zott is awarded with the "Goldener Zuckerhut" for Sahne Joghurt.
 2010: The senior manager of Zott, Frieda Reiter (born 1930), was awarded honorary citizenship of Mertingen on 18 September 2010. The dairy is named after her father-in-law Georg Zott.
 2012: Zott obtained in presence of Federal Minister of Agriculture Ilse Aigner, the license to use the "GM-free" label for the brands Zottarella and Bayerntaler.
 2013: Zott is awarded 11 times in a row for the PriMax of German Agricultural Society (DLG).
 2014: Zott is awarded for the fifth time with the national prize by the German Federal Ministry of Food and Agriculture (BmEL).

References

External links

Corporate Site
Zott
Brands
Monte
Jogobella
Zottarella
Sahne-Joghurt
Bayerntaler

Dairy products companies of Germany
German brands
Multinational food companies
Food and drink companies established in 1926
Multinational dairy companies
Companies based in Bavaria
Yogurt companies
German companies established in 1926